Colotis ione, the bushveld purple tip, common purple tip, or violet tip, is a butterfly of the family Pieridae. It is found in the dry parts of Africa south of the Sahara.

The wingspan is 45–52 mm.

The larva feeds on Maerua, Boscia, Capparis, Ritchiea, and Cadaba species.

External links
Colotis at Markku Savela's Lepidoptera and Some Other Life Forms
Seitz, A. Die Gross-Schmetterlinge der Erde 13: Die Afrikanischen Tagfalter. Plate XIII 17

Butterflies described in 1819
ione
Butterflies of Africa
Taxa named by Jean-Baptiste Godart